The San Carlos Charter Learning Center (SCCLC) is a charter school in San Carlos, California, United States. It was the first charter school in California and the second in the nation. It was created in 1994.

The San Carlos Charter Learning Center has a student population of about 350 students in grades K-8. It has students enrolled from all over the San Francisco Bay area. The Director of SCCLC, Jennifer Pellegrine, has been Director since 2020 and will be leaving at the end of the 2021-2022 school year. The incoming Interim Director will be Fran Dickinson, who is currently one of the 5th-grade teachers and has been teaching at SCCLC for over 20 years. He will be taking his new role at the start of the 2022-2023 school year. The unique features of CLC are its multi-grade classrooms and its emphasis on both strong academics and social and emotional growth.

External links
 

Charter K–8 schools in California
Schools in San Mateo County, California
1994 establishments in California